Concangis was an auxiliary castra in the Roman province of Lower Britain (Britannia Inferior). Its ruins are located in Chester-le-Street, Durham, in England, and are now known as Chester-le-Street Roman Fort.

Name
The name Concangis is Brittonic, but of uncertain meaning; it is possibly derived from a root *concos/*cancos meaning "horse".

History
It is east of the main Roman road of Dere Street that connected other forts near to Hadrian's Wall and beyond to Eboracum (York), and is situated close to Cade's Road which was speculated to have run from Eboracum to Pons Aelius. It is also speculated that Concangis may have been linked to Dere Street via a branch road heading west connecting to Longovicium (situated on Dere Street), but this has yet to be confirmed. The discovery by Raymond Selkirk of an abutment on the Cong Burn stream suggests that a bridge had been built there and had connected this fort with the one at Vindomora (Ebchester) to the west.

Concangis is listed on both the 4th/5th-century Notitia Dignitatum and the 7th-century Ravenna Cosmography. 

The fort is situated on a high bluff, overlooking the valleys of the Wear to the east and the Cong Burn to the north, hence the fort is in the sort of position frequently favoured by Roman military surveyors. The road north to Pons Aelius passes west of the fort and made monitoring of traffic easy. The fort covered roughly six and a half acres, and was built first in turf and timber probably in the 70s AD by the Legio IX Hispana (Ninth Hispanic Legion), and later in stone by the Legio II Augusta (the Second Augustan Legion), probably during the early 2nd century, coinciding with the construction of Hadrian's Wall, which was also built in part by Legio II.

Excavations were carried out in 1978 and in 1990/1991. Unfortunately much of the fort is located beneath the town of Chester-le-Street so little remains to be seen, except for a portion of the excavated officer's quarters left on display. Finds included pottery, fine table wares, coins, animal bones, a cheese press and curiously even a tile with a dog's footprint on it. Altars found range from ones dedicated to the war god Mars and the sun god Apollo, to ones to Celtic and German gods such as Digenis and Vitiris. The large (3 out of 8) number of altars dedicated to patron deities concerned with the wellbeing of veteran soldiers would seem to suggest the inhabitants of Concangis had a high proportion of ex-military men. Two large stones in a buttress of the parish church of St Mary and St Cuthbert have lewis holes for lifting,  which strongly suggest they were recycled from the Roman fort.

Garrison
A construction inscription attests the Legio II Augusta as having built/rebuilt the fort, but as is usual, this gives no evidence as to who occupied it as Legionaries only built the fortifications, it was the Auxilia that garrisoned it. An incomplete inscription mentions an Alae Antoninae (Antonine Wing), possibly on routine patrols and on restoration work on an aqueduct and latrines. The poor state of the inscription makes it impossible to identify the unit accurately, but based on finds nearby and units with similar names, it can be deduced the unit present was the Ala Secundae Asturum Antoniniana (Second Wing of Antonine Asturians). This unit was present for emperor Septimius Severus's campaigns in Caledonia and was also present at other forts such as Lindum (Lincoln).

A tile with the initials NV seems to suggest the Numeri Vigilum was present here during the 4th century AD. It was also listed as Praefectus Numeri Vigilum Concangios (The Prefect of the Company of Watchmen from Concangis) under the Duke of the Britains.

Gallery

See also
Roman engineering
Roman military engineering
Roman sites in the United Kingdom

References

External links
Details of fort
Detailed account of 1990/1991 excavations by MC Bishop
Historic Chester-le-Street website
Excavation History

Roman fortifications in England
Roman sites in County Durham
English Heritage sites in County Durham
Tourist attractions in County Durham
Chester-le-Street
Roman auxiliary forts in England